First Baptist Church is a historic Baptist church located at Sandy Creek in Oswego County, New York.  It was built in 1917–1918 and is a -story frame church with an octagonal plan and a pyramidal roof.  The front of the building features a three-stage rooftop tower.  The interior layout is based on the Akron plan.

It was listed on the National Register of Historic Places in 1988.

References

Churches on the National Register of Historic Places in New York (state)
Churches completed in 1918
20th-century Baptist churches in the United States
Churches in Oswego County, New York
Baptist churches in New York (state)
Akron Plan church buildings
National Register of Historic Places in Oswego County, New York